Marić is a South Slavic surname. It is the fourth most common surname in Croatia.

It may refer to:
Adnan Marić (born 1997), Swedish footballer
Aleks Marić (born 1984), Australian basketball player
Alisa Marić (born 1970), Serbian-American chess Woman's Grandmaster and International Master
Andrea Marić (born 1997), Croatian basketball player
Arijana Marić Gigliani (born 1979), Croatian-Bosnian opera singer
August Marić (1885–1957), Croatian soldier
Darko Marić (born 1975), Serbian footballer
Enver Marić (born 1948), Bosnian footballer
Goran Marić (born 1984), Serbian footballer
Goran Marić (born 1981), Serbian volleyball player
Igor Marić (born 1982), Croatian bobsledder
Igor Marić (born 1985), Croatian basketball player
Ivan Maric (born 1986), Australian rules footballer
Ivana Marić (born 1982), Bosnian Croat singer
Ivan Marić) (born 1994), Serbian footballer
Jovan Marić (born 1941), Bosnia-Serb psychiatrist
Ljubica Marić (1909–2002), Serbian composer
Luka Marić (1899–1979), Croatian geologist
Luka Marić (born 1987), Croatian footballer
Marcela Marić (born 1996), Croatian Olympic diver
Marijo Marić (born 1977), Croatian footballer
Marino Marić (born 1990), Croatian handball player
Marko Marić (born 1983), Croatian footballer, midfielder
Marko Marić (born 1996), Croatian footballer, goalkeeper
Martin Marić (born 1984), Croatian track and field athlete
Mateo Marić (born 1998), Bosnian footballer
Mijat Marić (born 1984), Croatian-Swiss footballer
Milan Marić (born 1981), Serbian actor
Milan Marić (born 1990), Serbian actor
Mileva Marić (1875–1948), Serbian mathematician and Albert Einstein's first wife
Milomir Marić (born 1956), Serbian journalist
Miloš Marić (born 1982), Serbian footballer
Mirjana Marić (born 1970), Serbian chess player
Mirko Marić (born 1995), Croatian footballer
Mirko Marić (born 1908) Chetnik Duke and regiment commander
Oliver Maric (born 1981), Croatian-Swiss footballer
Petar Marić (born 1987), Croatian basketball player
Radenka Maric, American scientist and academic administrator
Silvio Marić (born 1975), Croatian footballer
Slavko Marić (born 1984), Serbian footballer
Tomislav Marić (born 1973), Croatian footballer
Zdravko Marić (born 1977), Croatian politician
Zoran Marić (born 1960), Serbian footballer

References

Croatian surnames
Serbian surnames
Patronymic surnames
Matronymic surnames